St Sebastian's Church is the centre of worship of Christianity in Neyyassery. Neyyassery is a village in Kerala. The church is located in a beautiful location at the heart of this village. The church is located at 11 km away from Thodupuzha which is in Idukki district. It was established in 1852 AD and was rebuilt in 1987. First stone laid for new church on the feast day of Angel Michael (archangel). The parish celebrates Michael angel's feast and Saint Sebastian's feasts every year with lot of enthusiasm. This church is part of the Syro Malabar Church, India. The patron of the church is St.Sebastian.

Major celebrations

Feast day of Saint Sebastian

This is the major celebration in this church. St.Sebastian is the patron of the church.

Feast day of  Angel Michael

Foundation stone of the church was laid on the feast day of Angel Michael. So thereafter that day is celebrated with all enthusiasm. Normally the feast is celebrated for two days.

Brief chronology 
 Foundation stone laid in the year 1852
 New church was completed in the year 1992

Holy mass timing
 6.00 AM and 6.45AM on weekdays except Tuesdays
 On Sundays the timings are 06:00 AM,7:30 AM and 09:45 AM.

Special amenities

Proposed parish hall
The General body of the church has decided to construct a new parish hall with A/c provision  costing one crore in the nearby ground. The speciality of the hall will be
 The first and only A/c parish hall in Thodupuzha Thaluk
 With ample parking facility - 250 to 300 Cars at a time
 With 700 seating facility and 10,000 sq. feet area.

Contributions from the parishioners and the NRIs are the main source for fund besides its own fund. All are welcomed to contribute liberally for the ambitious project. Those working abroad and erstwhile parishioners are requested to sponsor liberally for the early completion of the project. Those willing to contribute are requested to contact Rev Fr Vicar  St: Sebastian's Church Neyyassery.

See also 
 Christianity in India
 Syrian Malabar Nasrani
 Michael (archangel)
 Saint Sebastian

External links
 List of churches of Kothamangalam diocese of Syro malabar church, India 
 Syro-Malabar Church website

Churches in Idukki district
Rebuilt buildings and structures in India
Syro-Malabar Catholic church buildings
Eastern Catholic churches in Kerala
Churches completed in 1852
Saint Sebastian